The Fatwa Council of the United Arab Emirates is a government body authorized in 2017 and established in 2018 which is responsible for licensing Islamic authorities to issue fatwas. According to a government press release, "the Council will ensure that religious scholars advocate moderate Islam and eliminate any source of conflict among existing and future fatwa".

References

Government of the United Arab Emirates